Aldobrandino da Polenta (died 1406) was the a lord of Ravenna of the da Polenta family.

He was the son of Guido III da Polenta: Aldobrandino and his brothers imprisoned him in 1389 to seize the power in the city. When Aldobrandino died in 1406, the last surviving brother, Obizzo, inherited the sole rule in Ravenna.

See also
Wars in Lombardy

1406 deaths
Aldobrandino
14th-century Italian nobility
15th-century Italian nobility
Year of birth unknown
Lords of Ravenna